Chernock is a family name. Notable people with it include:

 Arianne Chernock (born 1975), American historian 
 Beatrice Chernock (1908–1994), American educator and politician
 Sir Boteler Chernock, 4th Baronet (1696–1756), English politician
 Pynsent Chernock (1670–1734), English politician and landowner

See also
Chernock baronets